Béla Bartók's Mikrokosmos Sz. 107, BB 105 consists of 153 progressive piano pieces in six volumes written between 1926 and 1939. The individual pieces progress from very easy and simple beginner études to very difficult advanced technical displays, and are used in modern piano lessons and education. In total, according to Bartók, the piece "appears as a synthesis of all the musical and technical problems which were treated and in some cases only partially solved in the previous piano works." Volumes one and two are dedicated to his son Péter, while volumes five and six are intended as professionally performable concert pieces. Bartók also indicated that these pieces could also be played on other instruments; Huguette Dreyfus, for example, has recorded pieces from Books 3 through 6 on the harpsichord.

In 1940, shortly before they emigrated to the United States, he arranged seven of the pieces for two pianos, to provide additional repertoire for himself and his wife Ditta Pásztory-Bartók to play.

Volumes 
The pieces progress gradually in difficulty through the entire collection, from number 1 at the beginning of volume I to number 153 at the end of volume VI.

 Volumes I and II: Pieces 1–36 and 37–66, beginner level
 Volumes III and IV: Pieces 67–96 and 97–121, moderate to advanced level
 Volumes V and VI: Pieces 122–139 and 140–153, professional level

The list of pieces is as follows:

{| width=100%
|- valign ="top"
|width=33%|
 Volume I
 Six Unison Melodies (I)
 (a) Six Unison Melodies (II)
 (b) Six Unison Melodies (II)
 Six Unison Melodies (III)
 Six Unison Melodies (IV)
 Six Unison Melodies (V)
 Six Unison Melodies (VI)
 Dotted Notes
 Repetition (1)
 Syncopation (I)
 With Alternate Hands
 Parallel Motion
 Reflection
 Change of Position
 Question and Answer
 Village Song
 Parallel Motion with Change of Position
 Contrary Motion
 Four Unison Melodies (I)
 Four Unison Melodies (II)
 Four Unison Melodies (III)
 Four Unison Melodies (IV)
 Imitation and Counterpoint
 Imitation and Inversion (I)
 Pastorale
 Imitation and Inversion (II)
 Repetition (II)
 Syncopation (II)
 Canon at the Octave
 Imitation Reflected
 Canon at the Lower Fifth
 Dance in Canon Form
 In Dorian Mode
 Slow Dance
 In Phrygian Mode
 Chorale
 Free Canon

|width=33%|

 Volume II
 In Lydian Mode
 Staccato and Legato (I)
 Staccato and Legato (Canon)
 In Yugoslav Style
 Melody with Accompaniment
 Accompaniment in Broken Triads
 (a) In Hungarian Style (for two pianos)
 (b) In Hungarian Style
 Contrary Motion (2) (for two pianos)
 Meditation
 Increasing-Diminishing
 County Fair
 In Mixolydian Mode
 Crescendo-Diminuendo
 Minuetto
 Waves
 Unison Divided
 In Transylvanian Style
 Chromatics
 Triplets in Lydian Mode (for two pianos)
 Melody in Tenths
 Accents
 In Oriental Style
 Major and Minor
 Canon with Sustained Notes
 Pentatonic Melody
 Minor Sixths in Parallel Motion
 Buzzing
 (a) Line against Point
 (b) Line against Point
 Dialogue (with voice)
 Melody Divided

|width=33%|

 Volume III
 Thirds against a Single Voice
 Hungarian Dance (for two pianos)
 Study in Chords
 Melody against Double Notes
 Thirds
 Dragons' Dance
 Sixths and Triads
 (a) Hungarian Matchmaking Song
 (b) Hungarian Matchmaking Song (with voice)
 Triplets
 In Three Parts
 Little Study
 Five-Tone Scale
 Hommage à Johann Sebastian Bach
 Hommage à Robert Schumann
 Wandering
 Scherzo
 Melody with Interruptions
 Merriment
 Broken Chords
 Two Major Pentachords
 Variations
 Duet for Pipes
 In Four Parts (I)
 In Russian Style
 Chromatic Invention (I)
 Chromatic Invention (II)
 In Four Parts (II)
 Once Upon a Time...
 (a) Fox Song
 (b) Fox Song (with voice)
 Jolts
|}

{| width=100%
|- valign ="top"
|width=33%|

 Volume IV
 Notturno
 Thumbs Under
 Hands Crossing
 In Folk Song Style
 Diminished Fifth
 Harmonics
 Minor and Major
 (a) Wandering through the Keys
 (b) Wandering through the Keys
 Game (with Two Five-Tone Scales)
 Children's Song
 Melody in the Mist
 Wrestling
 From the Island of Bali
 And the Sounds Clash and Clang...
 Intermezzo
 Variations on a Folk Tune
 Bulgarian Rhythm (I)
 Theme and Inversion
 Bulgarian Rhythm (II)
 Song
 Bourrée
 Triplets in  Time
 Dance in  Time
 Triads
 Two-Part Study

|width=33%|

 Volume V
 Chords Together and in Opposition
 (a) Staccato and Legato (II)
 (b) Staccato and Legato (II)
 Staccato
 Boating
 Change of Time
 New Hungarian Folk Song (with voice)
 Stamping Dance
 Alternating Thirds
 Village Joke
 Fourths
 Major Seconds Broken and Together
 Syncopation (III)
 (a) Studies in Double Notes
 (b) Studies in Double Notes
 (c) Studies in Double Notes
 Perpetuum mobile
 Whole-Tone Scales
 Unison
 Bagpipe Music
 Merry Andrew

|width=33%|

 Volume VI
 Free Variations
 Subject and Reflection
 From the Diary of a Fly
 Divided Arpeggios
 Minor Seconds, Major Sevenths
 (a) Chromatic Invention (III)
 (b) Chromatic Invention (III)
 Ostinato
 March
 Six Dances in Bulgarian Rhythm (I)
 Six Dances in Bulgarian Rhythm (II)
 Six Dances in Bulgarian Rhythm (III)
 Six Dances in Bulgarian Rhythm (IV)
 Six Dances in Bulgarian Rhythm (V)
 Six Dances in Bulgarian Rhythm (VI)
|}

Music 
The opening (mm. 1–76) of "Boating" (V, 125) is typical of the modernist compositional techniques used in the later volumes, featuring the bimodal use of the pentatonic collection on E in the right hand and either G mixolydian or dorian collections in the left:

Volume VI contains the "Six Dances In Bulgarian Rhythm", dedicated to the English pianist Harriet Cohen. Bulgarian folk music is characterized by additive rhythm, that is, rhythm where the beats in each bar are of unequal length. For example, the first dance (148) is grouped into  (nine quavers in each bar), and the final dance (153) is grouped into  (eight in [https://www.youtube.com/watch?v=uMs8K9sZ2Qg each bar).

Bartók himself was the first to publicly perform pieces from Mikrokosmos, on February 9, 1937 in London.

References

External links

Compositions by Béla Bartók
Compositions for solo piano